Yuri Vladimirov (born January 1, 1942) is a Russian former Bolshoi Ballet dancer and a recipient of the following awards: Honoured Artist of RSFSR (1970), People's Artist of the USSR (1975) and Order of Honour (1976).

Biography
Vladimirov was born in a village of Vladimir, called Kosteryovo. In 1962 he graduated from the Moscow State Choreographic Academy where Aleksey Yermolayev was his teacher. He became a member of Bolshoi Ballet soon after, and was married to Nina Sorokina who was also a dancer. Currently he teaches such young ballet students as Dmitry Gudanov and Sergei Dorensky, among others. In 1967 he appeared as prince in the Nutcracker and two years later played as Spartacus in a play under the same name. In 1970 he was awarded Merited Artist of the Soviet Union award and next year played a leading role of Icarus in a play of the same name. In 1972, he appeared in a version of Anna Karenina to music by Rodion Shchedrin, and three years later played the role of Ivan the Terrible in a ballet of the same name. The same year, he became a recipient of the People's Artist of the USSR award and next year was seen playing a role of Benedick in a play called Love for Love after which he was awarded with the Order of Honour. Before he retired from dancing in 1987, he also played as a famous Rzhevsky in the Hussar Ballad.

References

Living people
1942 births
Honored Artists of the RSFSR
People's Artists of the RSFSR
People's Artists of the USSR